The Warp may refer to:

 The Warp (Warhammer), a concept of a different timespace in the fictional Warhammer universe
 The Warp (play), a ten-cycle play by Neil Oram

See also
 Warp (disambiguation)